Tenali is a constituency in Guntur district of Andhra Pradesh, representing the state legislative assembly in India. As per the Delimitation of Parliamentary and Assembly constituencies order (2008), the constituency covers Kollipara and Tenali mandals. It is one of the seven assembly segments of Guntur Lok Sabha constituency, along with Tadikonda, Mangalagiri Ponnur, Prathipadu, Guntur West, and Guntur East. Annabathuni Siva Kumar is the present MLA of the constituency, who won the 2019 Andhra Pradesh Legislative Assembly election from YSR Congress Party. As of 25 March 2019, there a total of 262,998 electors in the constituency.

Overview 
Constituency Details of Tenali (Assembly constituency):
Country: India.
 State: Andhra Pradesh.
 District: Guntur district.
 Region: Coastal Andhra.
 Seat: Semi-Urban.
 Eligible Electors as per 2019 General Elections: 2,22,222 Eligible Electors. Male Electors: 1,12,093. Female Electors:1,10,110.

Mandals 
There are two mandals in this constituency.

Members of Legislative Assembly 

Annabathuni siva kumar is the present MLA of the constituency representing the YSR Congress party. He defeated Alapati raja of Telugu Desam Party in the 2019 Andhra Pradesh Assembly Elections.

Election results

Assembly elections 2019

Assembly elections 2014

Assembly elections 2009

Assembly Elections 2004

Assembly elections 1999

Assembly elections 1994

Assembly elections 1989

Assembly elections 1985

Assembly elections 1983

Assembly elections 1978

Assembly elections 1972

Assembly elections 1967

Assembly elections 1962

Assembly elections 1955

Assembly elections 1952

See also 
 List of constituencies of the Andhra Pradesh Legislative Assembly
 Duggirala (Assembly constituency)
 దొడ్డపనేని ఇందిర Tenali Wikipedia page

References 

Assembly constituencies of Andhra Pradesh